The Arctic staghorn sculpin (Gymnocanthus tricuspis) is a species of marine ray-finned fish belonging to the family Cottidae, the typical sculpins. This sculpin is found in the Arctic Ocean and the northern Atlantic Ocean.

Taxonomy
The Arctic staghorn sculpin was first formally described as Cottus tricuspis in 1830 by the Danish zoologist Johan Reinhardt with the type locality given as Greenland. The specific name tricuspis means "three cusps", a reference to the three cusps on the upper spine on the preoperculum.

Description
The Arctic staghorn sculpin has dorsal fins supported by between 10 and 12 spines and between 14 and 17 soft rays while the anal fin has 15 to 19 soft rays. It has a dark upper body with two blackish brown bands on the flanks being made up of dark blotches. There is an irregular line of dark spots underneath the lateral line and the underside is pale, yellowish in females, the males having roundish white spots on their bellies. The dorsal fins have light and dark stripes while the caudal, anal and pectoral fins are pale, with a yellow tip and 4-5 diagonal lines of dark spots in the pectoral fins. There are flat, bony plates on the back and the top of the head. The scales of the lateral line scales are tubules embedded in the skin. There are no, or just a few, cirri on the head or body. The uppermost spine on the preoperculum is long and has 1 or more recurved spinules on its upper surface. This species is identified from its congeners by the lack of tubercles to the rear of the eyes and on the nape,  a thinner interorbital space  which has a width of less than 10% the length of the head and by the possession of many small plates between the eyes.

Distribution and habitat
The Arctic staghorn sculpin is found in teh Arctic Ocean and the northeastern and northwestern Atlantic Ocean. In North American waters it is normally found as far south as the Gulf of St Lawrence, occasionally reaching Maine. In the European waters it ranges from the  eastern coasts of Greenland, Iceland, along the northern coast of Norway north to the White Sea and the Barents Sea to Svalbard and Novaya Zemlya. It has been recorded on a variety of substrates including mud, gravel and rock, burrowing into sand and muddy-sand substrates.

Biology
The Arctic staghorn sculpin is a predator of polychaetes, gastropods, krill, benthic amphipods and echiurids. They in turn are preyed on by larger fishes such as Arctic cod, Atlantic cod, Bering flounder and polar eelpout.

References

Fish described in 1830
Arctic staghorn sculpin
Taxa named by Johan Reinhardt